Valeri Klimov is a hockey player who played in the HC Spartak Moscow hockey system. He spent several seasons with the club and was also on several occasions a member of Russia's U18 and U20 national teams.  The New Jersey Devils selected him late in the 2004 NHL Entry Draft with the 282nd overall pick, making him the last Russian selected that year. Since being drafted, Klimov made his Russian Superleague debut with HC Spartak Moscow during the 2005-06 season. But when the club disintegrated during the summer of 2006, the young defenseman signed a tryout contract with Khimik Voskresensk, and spent the 2006-07 season in that club's system.

Career statistics

Regular season and playoffs

International

References

External links 

RussianProspects.com Valeri Klimov Player Profile

1986 births
HC Khimik Voskresensk players
HC Spartak Moscow players
Living people
New Jersey Devils draft picks
Russian ice hockey defencemen